Diego Jesus José (born December 11, 1976 in Rosario) is an Argentine professional footballer. He currently plays for U.S. PONS.

José played on the professional level in the Primera División Argentina for Rosario Central.

References

1976 births
Living people
Argentine footballers
Argentine expatriate footballers
Expatriate footballers in France
Rosario Central footballers
Club Atlético Tigre footballers
All Boys footballers
Angoulême Charente FC players
FC Rouen players
Argentine expatriate sportspeople in France
US Raon-l'Étape players
FC Vesoul players
FC Montceau Bourgogne players
Jura Sud Foot players
Association football forwards
Footballers from Rosario, Santa Fe